Parathyroid oxyphil cells are one out of the two types of cells found in the parathyroid gland, the other being parathyroid chief cell.  Oxyphil cells are only found in a select few number of species and humans are one of them.

These cells can be found in clusters in the center of the section and at the periphery.  Oxyphil cells appear at the onset of puberty, but have no known function. It is perceived that oxyphil cells may be derived from chief cells at puberty, as they are not present at birth like chief cells. Oxyphil cells increase in number with age.

Structure 
Oxyphil cells may be binucleated and proteins found within their cytoplasms are basic, resulting in acidophilic cytoplasms. Cytochemically, oxyphil cells and C cells are fairly similar. Oxyphil cells are much larger in size (12–20 μm) compared with chief cells (6–8 μm) and also stain lighter than chief cells. Oxyphil cells have a cytoplasm filled with many, large mitochondria. Oxyphil cells have abundant cytoplasmic glycogen and ribosomes that are interspersed between the mitochondria. The endoplasmic reticulum, Golgi apparatuses, and secretory granules are poorly developed in oxyphil cells of normal parathyroid glands

Function 
With nuclear medicine scans, they selectively take up the Technetium-sestamibi complex radiotracer to allow delineation of glandular anatomy.
Oxyphil cells have been shown to express parathyroid-relevant genes found in the chief cells and have the potential to produce additional autocrine/paracrine factors, such as parathyroid hormone-related protein (PTHrP) and calcitriol. Oxyphil cells have also been shown to have higher oxidative and hydrolytic enzyme activity than chief cells due to having more mitochondria. Oxyphil cells have significantly more calcium-sensing receptors (CaSRs) than chief cells. More work needs to be done to fully understand the functions of these cells and their secretions.

See also 
List of human cell types derived from the germ layers
 Chromophobe cell
 Melanotroph
 Chromophil
 Acidophil cell
 Basophil cell
 Pituitary gland
 Neuroendocrine cell

References 

Endocrine cells
Human cells
Parathyroid